Sepehr is a Persian masculine given name and a surname. It means celestial sphere. People with the name include:

Given name
 Sepehr Heydari (born 1980), Iranian football player 
 Sepehr Mohammadi (born 1989), Iranian futsal player 
 Sepehr Salimi (born 1981), Iranian blogger and activist

Surname
 Ahmad Ali Sepehr (1889–1976), Iranian historian and politician
 Mohammad Taqi Sepehr (1801–1880), Iranian court historian

See also
 Shahin & Sepehr, Iranian-American guitarist duo
 Sepehr (disambiguation)

Persian-language surnames
Persian masculine given names